The 1921 Texas A&M Aggies football team represented the Agricultural and Mechanical College of Texas—now known as Texas A&M University—as a member of the Southwest Conference (SWC) in the 1921 college football season. Led by fourth-year head coach Dana X. Bible, Texas A&M compiled an overall record of 6–1–2 with a mark of 3–0–2 in conference play, winning the SWC title. The Aggies were invited to the Dixie Classic, where they beat Centre.

Schedule

References

Texas AandM
Texas A&M Aggies football seasons
Southwest Conference football champion seasons
Texas AandM Aggies football